In planetary sciences, the moment of inertia factor or normalized polar moment of inertia is a dimensionless quantity that characterizes the radial distribution of mass inside a planet or satellite.  Since a moment of inertia must have dimensions of mass times length squared, the moment of inertia factor is the coefficient that multiplies these.

Definition
For a planetary body with principal moments of inertia , the moment of inertia factor is defined as
,
where C is the polar moment of inertia of the body, M is the mass of the body, and R is the mean radius of the body. For a sphere with uniform density, .  For a differentiated planet or satellite, where there is an increase of density with depth, .  The quantity is a useful indicator of the presence and extent of a planetary core, because a greater departure from the uniform-density value of 2/5 conveys a greater degree of concentration of dense materials towards the center.

Solar System values
The Sun has by far the lowest moment of inertia factor value among Solar System bodies; it has by far the highest central density (compared to ~13 for Earth) and a relatively low average density (1.41 g/cm3 versus 5.5 for Earth). Saturn has the lowest value among the gas giants in part because it has the lowest bulk density. Ganymede has the lowest moment of inertia factor among solid bodies in the Solar System because of its fully differentiated interior, a result in part of tidal heating due to the Laplace resonance, as well as its substantial component of low density water ice. Callisto is similar in size and bulk composition to Ganymede, but is not part of the orbital resonance and is less differentiated. The Moon is thought to have a small core, but its interior is otherwise relatively homogenous.

Measurement
The polar moment of inertia is traditionally determined by combining measurements of spin quantities (spin precession rate and/or obliquity) with gravity quantities (coefficients of a spherical harmonic representation of the gravity field). These geodetic data usually require an orbiting spacecraft to collect.

Approximation
For bodies in hydrostatic equilibrium, the Darwin–Radau relation can provide estimates of the moment of inertia factor on the basis of shape, spin, and gravity quantities.

Role in interior models
The moment of inertia factor provides an important constraint for models representing the interior structure of a planet or satellite.  At a minimum, acceptable models of the density profile must match the volumetric mass density and moment of inertia factor of the body.

Gallery of internal structure models

Notes

References

Astrophysics
Planetary science
Moment (physics)